Paul "Diddy" Dan (born 1985) is a rugby union player hailing from Newcastle, New South Wales.

Career
Rising to prominence through St Francis Xavier College under the tutelage of Mark Wright, Dan played first grade for the Hamilton Hawks as a teenager and was selected in the New South Wales Waratahs junior teams. Observers noted that Dan was unlucky to miss selection in the junior Australian team, however he moved to Sydney to pursue his career and played first grade for the Manly Marlins in the Tooheys New Cup. After a devastating hamstring kept him out of rugby for over a year, Dan returned to Newcastle in 2007 where he led the Hamilton Hawks to lose the NHRU grand final.  In 2008 Dan played number ten for both Newcastle and NSW Country, leading the latter to the Australian Country Rugby Championships. He also won a Grand Final with Hamilton in 2008, defeating University in the decider.

References

Living people
Australian rugby union players
1985 births
Place of birth missing (living people)
Sportspeople from Newcastle, New South Wales